Lonchitis is a neotropical genus of ferns. It is the sole genus in the family Lonchitidaceae. At one time Lonchitis was placed in the Dennstaedtiaceae, and then transferred to the Lindsaeaceae, before being placed in its own family.

Phylogeny
Plants of the World Online  as of  recognizes the following species:

Phylogeny of Lonchitis

References

Polypodiales
Fern genera